Novoye Polkhovo is a rural locality (a village) in Lavrovskoye Rural Settlement, Sudogodsky District, Vladimir Oblast, Russia. The population was 62 as of 2010. There are 6 streets.

Geography 
Novoye Polkhovo is located on the Yada River, 6 km northeast of Sudogda (the district's administrative centre) by road. Zagorye is the nearest rural locality.

References 

Rural localities in Sudogodsky District